Bhanu Goenda Jahar Assistant is an Indian Bengali-language romantic comedy film directed by Purnendu Roy Chowdhury and produced by Badalraja Sinha. This film was released in 1971 under the banner of Joydeep Pictures. Shyamal Mitra was the music director of the movie.

Plot 
Nupur, daughter of Digambar Chatterjee flees away from her home in Delhi to avoid her marriage. His father announces a reward of ten thousand for her. Nupur comes to Kolkata and takes shelter in the house of Anjan Mukherjee. Anjan realises her problem and helps her. In the meantime detective duos Bhanu Roy and Jahar Banerjee start searching Nupur for prize money.

Cast 
 Bhanu Banerjee as Bhanu Roy
 Jahor Roy as Jahar Banerjee
 Subhendu Chatterjee as Anjan
Lily Chakravarty as Nupur
Pahari Sanyal as Digambar Chatterjee
Nripati Chattopadhyay
 Shyam Laha
 Bankim Ghosh
 Nilima Chatterjee
 Haridhan Mukherjee
 Biren Chatterjee
Sailen Gangopadhyay
Sital Bandyopadhyay

Soundtrack
Music: Shyamal Mitra 
Lyrics: Pranab Roy

"Phooler Marshum Chandni" - Sandhya Mukherjee
"Malatir Kunjabone Bhramarer Gunjarane" - Sandhya Mukherjee
"Kakhan Ki Hoy" - Shyamal Mitra
"Dure Jadi Chale Jaai" - Sandhya Mukherjee, Shyamal Mitra
"Raater Chokhe Ghumer Kajol" - Leena Ghatak, Shyamal Mitra

References

External links 
 

Bengali-language Indian films
1971 films
1971 romantic comedy films
Indian romantic comedy films
1970s Bengali-language films
Films set in Delhi
Films set in Kolkata